The 2021–22 Albany Great Danes women's basketball team represented the University at Albany, SUNY during the 2021–22 NCAA Division I women's basketball season. The Great Danes, led by fourth year head coach Colleen Mullen, played their home games at SEFCU Arena and were members of the America East Conference.

They finished the season 23–10, 13–5 in America East play to finish in a tie for third place. As the second seed in the America East tournament, they defeated New Hampshire in the Quarterfinals, Vermont in the semifinals, and Maine in the Final to finish as tournament champions.  They received an automatic bid to the NCAA tournament, where they were the sixteenth seed in the Wichita Region.  They were defeated in the First Round by Louisville to end their season.

Previous season
The Great Danes finished the season 7–11, 5–7 in America East play to finish in fourth place.  As the fourth seed in the America East tournament, they defeated New Hampshire in the Quarterfinals before losing to Maine in the Semifinals.  They were not invited to the NCAA tournament or the WNIT.

Roster

Schedule
Source: 

|-
!colspan=9 style=| Non-conference regular season

|-
!colspan=6 style=| America East Regular Season

|-
!colspan=6 style=| America East tournament

|-
!colspan=6 style=| NCAA tournament

Rankings

The Coaches Poll did not release a Week 2 poll and the AP Poll did not release a poll after the NCAA Tournament.

References

Albany Great Danes women's basketball seasons
Albany Great Danes
Albany
Albany Great Danes
Albany